The Sinful Village is a 1940 German comedy film directed by Joe Stöckel and starring Stöckel, Elise Aulinger and Georg Bauer. It is based on the play Das sündige Dorf by Max Neal. A remake was made in 1954 with Stöckel reprising his role. Another version was released in 1966.

It was made at the Bavaria Studios in Munich and on location in Samerberg. The film's sets were designed by the art directors Rudolf Pfenninger and Ludwig Reiber.

Cast
Joe Stöckel as Thomas Stangassinger
Elise Aulinger as Frau Stangassinger
Georg Bauer as Sepp Stangassinger
Albert Janschek as Toni Stangassinger
Josef Eichheim as Korbinian Bachmaier
Hansi Knoteck as Vevi
Wastl Witt as Vogelhuber
Erna Fentsch as Afra Vogelhuber
Beppo Brem as Wegscheidbauer
Bertl Schultes as Sonnhofer
Ludwig Schmid-Wildy as Bürgermeister
Julius Frey as Fastwirt
Adolf Gondrell as Lawyer
Margarete Haagen as Hökerin
Maria Stadler as Kuni
Ingeborg Hoffmann as Leni
Emmy Sourmann as Sonnhoferin
Hans Schulz as Gemeindediener
Vera Complojer as Barbara Veit
Erich Teibler as Hirtenjunge

References

Bibliography
 Alexandra Ludewig. Screening Nostalgia: 100 Years of German Heimat Film. 2014.

External links
 

1940 films
Films of Nazi Germany
1940 comedy films
1940s German-language films
German films based on plays
Films set in Bavaria
Films set in the Alps
Bavaria Film films
Films directed by Joe Stöckel
German black-and-white films
German comedy films
1940s German films